Black Mask (Roman Sionis) is a supervillain appearing in comic books published by DC Comics. Created by Doug Moench and Tom Mandrake, the character debuted in Batman #386 (August 1985). He is commonly depicted as a brutal and ruthless crime lord in Gotham City who has a fixation with masks and derives sadistic pleasure from the act of torture. Black Mask is one of the most enduring enemies of the superhero Batman and belongs to the collective of adversaries that make up his rogues gallery.

The character has been substantially adapted from the comics into various forms of media, including the animated series The Batman, the animated film Batman: Under the Red Hood, and the Batman: Arkham video game series. Black Mask made his live-action debut in the 2014 television series Gotham, as Richard Sionis, portrayed by Todd Stashwick; this version of the character was later integrated into comics in the 2016 relaunch DC Rebirth as The Mask, depicted as the Black Mask's father. Black Mask also appears in the 2020 DC Extended Universe (DCEU) film Birds of Prey, portrayed by Ewan McGregor, and the second season of the Arrowverse series Batwoman, portrayed by Peter Outerbridge.

Fictional character biography

Origin story

Black Mask's origin story was established in his first appearance. Roman Sionis was born to wealthy and self-absorbed parents, who cared more about their social status than their own son. Moments after Roman's birth, the doctor carelessly dropped him on his head, and his parents covered up the entire incident so that their high society friends would not find out. Years later, he was attacked by a rabid raccoon at the Sionis family country estate, and his parents forbade him to mention the incident to anyone. Despite their dislike for fellow socialites Thomas and Martha Wayne, Roman's parents continued to associate with them to maintain their social standing, and forced Roman to befriend their son, Bruce. His parents' hypocrisy had a deep impact on Roman, and he grew to resent them and the "masks" that they wore in public.

After graduating from high school, Roman was given a high-ranking position in his father's company, Janus Cosmetics. There, he met and fell in love with working-class model Circe, though his parents did not approve of the relationship and forced him to break it off. Enraged, Roman burned down his family mansion, killing both of his parents and inheriting their fortune and business. Roman lacked his father's business acumen and eventually ruined Janus Cosmetics by funding a failed line of face-paint make-up. Desperate, Roman had the staff chemists create a product that was rushed to the market without proper testing, disfiguring several hundred women. Circe, now Roman's fiancée, then broke up with him in front of his entire staff.

Bruce Wayne, now the head of Wayne Enterprises, offered to bail Janus Cosmetics out on the condition that Roman gave up control and allowed Wayne to appoint his own board of directors. Humiliated and furious, Roman broke into the cemetery where his parents were buried. Before he could unlock the Sionis crypt, a lightning bolt struck him, blasting the door open and hurling Roman head-first into a nearby stone. Roman took the incident as an omen of his "rebirth" and entered the crypt, smashing his father's ebony casket with the stone and using its shattered pieces to carve an ebony mask, resembling a scowling face, starting a new life as the crime lord Black Mask.

Criminal career
Within a month, Black Mask had assembled a group of dozens of criminals, leading to the creation of the Sionis Crime Family, better known as the False Face Society, using the Sionis crypt as their base of operations. Each member of the False Face Society wore a distinctive mask, and the gang's crime spree spread rapidly throughout Gotham, eventually attracting the attentions of the police and Bruce Wayne, now operating as the vigilante Batman. To settle old scores, Black Mask murdered three Wayne Foundation executives and kidnapped Circe, forcing her to don a mask laced with Janus Cosmetics' toxic makeup, sparing her life but permanently disfiguring her face. Black Mask then threatened Circe into rejoining him, giving her a "mannequin" mask intentionally designed to mock her former life.

Batman eventually managed to deduce Black Mask's identity and correctly predicted that Bruce Wayne would be Sionis' next target. To set a trap for Black Mask, Bruce held a masquerade ball at Wayne Manor, and Sionis infiltrated the ball and lured Bruce to the mansion's conservatory to kill him. Bruce disarmed Sionis, forcing the latter to retreat to his hideout with Robin (Jason Todd) secretly following him. While Batman and Robin fought his underlings at the graveyard, Black Mask escaped through a false bottom installed in his father's coffin and headed to his family estate. Black Mask then entered his old bedroom and set fire to the old toys inside, intending to burn the mansion to the ground to symbolically kill his old identity as Sionis. Before Black Mask could escape, Batman flung a Batarang-attached cable around the crime lord's knees, causing him to fall face-first on the burning floor just as the bedroom's rafters began to collapse. The rafters pinned Black Mask's face into the pile of burning toys, and although Batman and Robin were able to tow him out of the fire, Sionis' mask had been burned onto his face. Black Mask was subsequently sent to Arkham Asylum, where he remained behind bars until the international terrorist Ra's al Ghul freed all of its inmates. Black Mask was not amongst the criminals who followed the Joker in searching for the one behind the breakout and thus never took part in the "war" against Batman's allies and loved ones. As this tale was the last "canonical" one to take place on Earth-One, it can be assumed that Black Mask remained at large.

Following Crisis on Infinite Earths, Jeremiah Arkham frees all of Arkham Asylum's inmates, including Black Mask, to attack Batman during the events of "The Last Arkham". Sionis then returns to crime after an unspecified breakout, evidently retaining most of his Pre-Crisis history. He soon begins the False Face Society anew, rising through the ranks of Gotham City's underworld while furthering his vendetta against Bruce Wayne. To stop the False Face Society, Batman poses as a new recruit to their ranks, christened "Skullface" by Black Mask himself. Black Mask later kidnaps Lucius Fox, who had a hand in Bruce Wayne's bailout of Janus Cosmetics. Although Batman is eventually able to save Fox, Black Mask manages to evade capture. Black Mask remains at large throughout the events of "Knightfall" and "Zero Hour", and resurfaces shortly thereafter to kill rival mobster "Dirty Dan" Doyle in an ambush shootout.

Black Mask is later approached by the Black Spider, who wishes to join the False Face Society. Black Mask demands the young man to "make his bones" first by crashing a masquerade ball being held at Wayne Manor. Batman later learns that the Black Spider is a double agent working for mobster "Turk" Ottoman, and tracks him down to an abandoned theater where he prevents him from shooting Black Mask, who subsequently escapes during the chaos. Black Mask reappears as a crime lord in "The Cult" storyline, having given up his vendetta against Bruce Wayne. He controls a large portion of Gotham's criminal underworld until the city is destroyed by an earthquake in the "No Man's Land" story arc.

Black Mask later becomes the leader of a cult, whose trademark is ritual scarring, foregoing his mask and disfiguring his face to resemble a blackened human skull until Batman and the Huntress dissolve it by defeating and imprisoning Black Mask in Blackgate Penitentiary, though the crime lord escapes before the city is made a part of the country again.

In Catwoman vol. 3 #16, Black Mask begins a drug trafficking ring and decides to move his organization into Gotham's East End. Catwoman soon begins interfering with Black Mask's plans, stealing money from him and giving it to the poor. Black Mask retaliates by forcing Sylvia Sinclair to reveal Catwoman's secret identity to him. After destroying Catwoman's youth center, Black Mask kidnaps her sister and brother-in-law, the latter of whom he tortures to death with power tools, before forcing the former to eat pieces of her husband's corpse, including his eyeballs. Catwoman arrives to find her brother-in-law dead, her sister insane, and her friend Holly Robinson on the verge of being tortured. Enraged, Catwoman engages Black Mask at his penthouse, where the crime lord falls from the top of the building.

In Act Two of War Games, the Spoiler seeks out hoping to get Batman control of all of Gotham's crime lords. However, Black Mask murders Orpheus by slitting his throat and proceeds to torture the Spoiler to obtain information about the rest of her plan. Black Mask then assumes Orpheus' identity using face putty and padding, fooling even Batman and Onyx. As Orpheus, he goes on a mission to kill any member or associate of the Batman Family. As Black Mask returns to continue torturing the Spoiler for entertainment, he finds that she has escaped and subsequently tracks her down. Although she escapes his clutches once again, the Spoiler supposedly dies due to the injuries inflicted on her and the willful negligence of Leslie Thompkins.

Black Mask later infiltrates Oracle's Clocktower in an attempt to expose her to the mob, and Batman attacks him in a blind rage. Fearful that Black Mask will kill Batman, Oracle activates a self-destruct device in the tower to get Batman to save her. Black Mask then becomes the overlord of Gotham's underworld, gathering enough financial resources to purchase an Amazo android and a large supply of kryptonite. Allied with reporter Arturo Rodriguez, Black Mask begins a campaign to discredit Batman; while Rodriguez slams Batman in the press, Black Mask commits a series of murders disguised as the Dark Knight. The real Batman eventually exposes Rodriguez and captures Black Mask, but the crime lord kills the escorting officer transporting him to jail and escapes again.

Later, a series of attacks by the Red Hood (revealed later as being Batman's presumed deceased protégé Jason Todd) causes Black Mask to lose power and money to this new rival. The assassin Deathstroke later approaches Black Mask, offering him a place within the Society. Eager to strengthen his increasingly tenuous grip on the underworld, the crime lord accepts. However, the Red Hood is even able to elude the Society's members; eventually he completely dismantles Black Mask's control over the city's organized crime. Black Mask then continues to threaten the most important people in Catwoman's life, prompting her to retaliate by shooting Black Mask's jaw with her gun, killing him. After the shooting, Selina Kyle passes the mantle of Catwoman to her friend Holly, who is soon arrested for Sionis' murder. During the Gotham Underground storyline, dozens of would-be crime bosses attempt to fill in the vacancy created by Black Mask's death.

In Blackest Night, Black Mask is resurrected as a Black Lantern and attempts to show Catwoman why "shooting him in the head was a bad idea". In an attempt to scare Catwoman, Black Mask goes after her sister once more. He demonstrates the ability to fly and reorganize the structures of buildings. Poison Ivy manages to stop Black Mask by trapping him inside a mutated pitcher plant, its digestive juices dissolving his body as fast as his ring could regenerate it.

The New 52
In The New 52 reboot (launched in 2011), Roman Sionis is re-established as Black Mask, and his history with the False Face Society remains somewhat intact. This version of the character has split personality disorder, with Roman Sionis being one personality and Black Mask being the other, and the technology in his mask grants him the ability to control "the weak minded". Roman Sionis is first seen in Arkham Asylum's infirmary being treated by Dr. Jeremiah Arkham during the Night of the Owls; Sionis attempted a hunger strike to try to regain his mask. When the Talons attack the Asylum, Dr. Arkham gives Sionis his mask back to telepathically influence the inmates into attacking the Talons and keep anyone from following Arkham to his safe room. Black Mask then attempts to use his abilities on Batman, but fails and is forced to escape the asylum. Black Mask later resurfaces to re-assemble the False Face Society, coming into conflict with the Mad Hatter while doing so (who considers Black Mask an enemy due to their similar mind control abilities). Batman intervenes and puts an end to their battle and Sionis is sent back to Arkham Asylum. During the Forever Evil storyline, Black Mask appears as a member of the Secret Society of Super Villains when the Crime Syndicate arrive from their Earth. Black Mask and his False Face Society crash the Rogues' battle against Mr. Freeze and Clayface to claim the bounty on the Rogues.

DC Rebirth
In the DC Rebirth reboot, Roman Sionis remains one of Gotham's most powerful crime lords. This version of the character dons a black metallic mask and is allied with the Penguin and the Great White Shark in an alliance known as "the Blacks and Whites". Together, they hire the KGBeast to kill Batman. In the Watchmen sequel Doomsday Clock, Black Mask is among the villains that attend an underground meeting held by the Riddler to talk about the Superman Theory. In Teen Titans Rebirth, Damian Wayne keeps Black Mask locked up in his secret prison after learning about his involvement in the destruction of the Arab restaurant Tarbooshes.

Powers and abilities

Black Mask is a criminal mastermind and tactical analyst with vast wealth and resources at his disposal, making him one of the most powerful crime bosses in Gotham's criminal underbelly. He utilizes his various connections to eliminate opposition and consolidates power using fear and intimidation; he is renowned for his brutally sadistic physical and psychological torture techniques, which he uses either to extract information or simply to torment his enemies for entertainment. Black Mask is an expert marksman with firearms, particularly with his signature twin automatic pistols, although he is proficient with melee weapons such as swords as well. He is a skilled hand-to-hand combatant and has displayed impressive levels of stamina and endurance; his high tolerance for pain has allowed him to hold his own against accomplished fighters such as Batman and Catwoman. Black Mask is also an accomplished businessman, impersonator, actor, and escape artist.

Per the events of The New 52, Roman Sionis' ebony black mask possesses hypnosis-like mind controlling abilities that extend through the material of the masks that his henchmen wear, rendering them directly under his control. Black Mask has also killed his victims by applying toxin-filled masks to their faces, poisoning them and leaving their faces hideously shriveled and blackened. His mask also allows him to assume the form of other people, from Ted Kord to Superman, though without assuming their powers.

Other characters named Black Mask

Jeremiah Arkham
In the Battle for the Cowl storyline, a second criminal using the Black Mask alias emerges. His identity is eventually revealed to be Dr. Jeremiah Arkham, who took up Roman Sionis' mantle after suffering a psychotic breakdown from exposure to a variety of mind-altering chemicals from various Batman villains.

Richard Sionis
In DC's line-wide revision of its superhero comics, DC Rebirth, a story presents Black Mask's father Richard Sionis as the precursor to the Black Mask alias, where he was just called "the Mask" and was the founder of the Sionis Crime Family, also known as the False Face Society. When Richard was in the hospital and dying of old age, Roman sneaked into the hospital disguised as a nurse and poisoned his father to gain complete control over the False Face Society; he leaves his father's signature mask on his corpse. This story retconned the information that Charles Sionis was his father. Richard Sionis / The Mask was first introduced in the FOX television drama Gotham, portrayed by Todd Stashwick and depicted as an adaptation of Black Mask.

Other versions

Batman: Crimson Mist
In the Elseworlds storyline Batman: Crimson Mist, Black Mask arrogantly dismisses Two-Face's warnings about the now-vampiric Batman, believing himself untouchable until Batman attacks the False Face Society in their warehouse base while in the form of a monstrous bat. The vampiric Dark Knight tears through Black Mask's minions, even tearing a man's head off with his mouth, and is later shown leaving the Society's severed heads outside Blackgate Penitentiary, including Black Mask's.

Batman: Gotham Adventures
Black Mask appears in Batman: Gotham Adventures, the accompanying comic book series to The New Batman Adventures, set within the DC Animated Universe.

The Batman Adventures
During The Batman Adventures comic book series, Roman Sionis is depicted as a businessman who turned his company into a corporate juggernaut, until Wayne Enterprises results in the loss of his industry. An associate of Red Hood approaches Roman, convincing him to become the Black Mask and lead the False Face Society, though he is ultimately apprehended by Batman.

The Batman Strikes!
In The Batman Strikes! comics, Black Mask extorts Bruce Wayne into making a deal with him and attempts to take complete control of Gotham's criminal underworld by ridding it of its other villains.

Batman: Arkham Unhinged
Black Mask appears in issues #35–37 (storyline "Evidence Notice") of Batman: Arkham Unhinged, the prequel tie-in comic book to the video game Batman: Arkham City.

Injustice: Gods Among Us
In Injustice: Gods Among Us, Black Mask is seen fighting against the Justice League during Harley Quinn's riot, and later appears in Year Five, where he gathers with six other criminals (Scarecrow, Mad Hatter, Man-Bat, Bronze Tiger, Tweedledee and Tweedledum). When Damian Wayne intervenes in their meeting, the villains knock him into unconsciousness until Dick Grayson saves him.

Harley Quinn: The Animated Series: Legion of Bats!
In this six-issue miniseries set after season 3 of Harley Quinn, Black Mask appears as the primary antagonist, plotting to assemble an army of powerful supervillains to take over Gotham and, subsequently, the world. As a result, he finds himself at odds with Poison Ivy, who wants to use some of the same villains for her new all-girl Legion of Doom, as well as Harley Quinn and the Bat Family.

In other media

Television
 Black Mask appears in The Batman, voiced by James Remar. This version has a skull-like face and no fingerprints or distinguishing features, making it impossible to identify him.
 Black Mask appears in Batman: The Brave and the Bold, voiced by John DiMaggio. This version resembles a combination of his original and modern appearances, possesses a bulky and physically imposing build, and is the leader of the False Face Society.
 Richard Sionis appears in Gotham, portrayed by Todd Stashwick. Introduced in the season one episode "The Mask", this version is the head of the Sionis crime family who utilizes a front called Sionis Investments and hosts a secret organized fight club where his employees fight to secure more lucrative positions in his company, which is broadcast to some of Gotham's elite. While investigating the fight club, Detective Jim Gordon confronts, fights, and arrests Richard, who is incarcerated in Arkham Asylum as of season two. In the episode "Rise of the Villains: Damned If You Do...", Tabitha Galavan causes a mass breakout to recruit inmates on her brother Theo Galavan's behalf. When Richard declines, Tabitha kills him as a warning to the other escapees.
 Roman Sionis / Black Mask appears in the second season of Batwoman, portrayed by Peter Outerbridge. This version wears a skull mask, is an associate of Safiyah Sohail, the leader of the Sionis crime family, also known as the False Face Society, and the CEO of Janus Cosmetics who blames the Crows security firm and Kate Kane / Batwoman for the death of his daughter Circe Sionis amidst a mass breakout at Arkham Asylum caused by Alice. Throughout the season, he has several encounters with Ryan Wilder / Batwoman while running a "Snakebite" drug ring and hiring Enigma to hypnotize Kane into believing she is a disfigured Circe until Alice and "Team Batwoman" rescue Kane and undo her brainwashing before foiling Roman's plot to cause a crime wave in Gotham. Following this, Roman and Alice have been remanded to Arkham.

Film

 Black Mask appears in Batman: Under the Red Hood, voiced by Wade Williams. This version is the first crime lord to take control of Gotham in years.
 Black Mask appears in Batman: Bad Blood, voiced by Steve Blum. This version resembles his Arkham Origins counterpart.
 Roman Beauvais Sionis / Black Mask appears in Birds of Prey, portrayed by Ewan McGregor. This version is a narcissistic, skull-masked crime lord and leader of the False Face Society who masquerades as the charismatic owner of the "Black Mask Club", a popular nightclub among Gotham's criminal element. Cut off from the family fortune after running their business into the ground, Roman seeks to become the most powerful kingpin in the city to outdo his father. While pursuing this goal, he has the Bertinelli crime family murdered to obtain a diamond embedded with the account numbers to their fortune. When Cassandra Cain steals the diamond from him, Sionis places a bounty on her head, but is eventually confronted by Helena Bertinelli, Harley Quinn, Dinah Lance, and Renee Montoya. In the ensuing fight, he kidnaps Cain and is pursued by Quinn, but the former hides a grenade in his pocket before the latter knocks off the Amusement Mile pier, during which he is killed by the grenade before hitting the water.
 Black Mask makes a non-speaking cameo appearance in Batman: Death in the Family. He is killed by Jason Todd as one of three different identities in the following manners depending on the viewer's choices: Todd as Hush via a rocket launcher, Todd as Red Robin via an emergency door activated by a rocket launcher, and Todd as Red Hood via shattered glass created by an emitter projectile.
 Black Mask appears in Catwoman: Hunted, voiced by Jonathan Banks. This version is a member of Leviathan.

Video games

Lego DC series

 Black Mask appears as an unlockable character in Lego Batman: The Videogame.
 Black Mask appears in the Nintendo 3DS version of Lego Batman 2: DC Super Heroes.

Batman: Arkham

Roman Sionis / Black Mask appears in the Batman: Arkham video game franchise, voiced by Nolan North (in Arkham City) and Brian Bloom (in subsequent appearances). This version is known for using body doubles in dangerous situations.
 Black Mask makes a cameo appearance in Batman: Arkham City (2011). During the opening of the story mode, Bruce Wayne sees Black Mask being subdued at the gates of Arkham City by Professor Hugo Strange's TYGER guards. Additionally, an Arkham City Story reveals that Black Mask previously attempted to escape Arkham City by blasting a hole in a containment wall, but was recaptured. He is also featured in several exclusive challenge maps.
 Black Mask also appears in the prequel Batman: Arkham Origins (2013). Prior to the story mode, Sionis is kidnapped by the Joker, who subsequently poses as Black Mask on Christmas Eve and hires eight assassins to kill Batman. Batman frees Sionis to learn more about the Joker's whereabouts, but is attacked by Copperhead, allowing Sionis to escape. In a side mission, Sionis attempts to rebuild his criminal empire by stashing several drug canisters throughout Gotham City, but Batman ultimately destroys them and defeats Sionis and his henchmen. Black Mask also appears in a challenge map DLC pack.
 Black Mask appears in the companion game Batman: Arkham Origins Blackgate (2013), wherein he takes control of Blackgate Penitentiary's Industrial Building during a prison riot. If Batman defeats him last, the ending sees Black Mask being apprehended by two guards, one of whom he takes hostage. The remaining guard tries to shoot him, but accidentally hits a gas main that triggers an explosion and burns Black Mask's mask into his skin before he flees the prison.
 Black Mask appears in the Batman: Arkham Knight (2015) "Red Hood" DLC, in which the titular character tracks down and throws him out of a window to his apparent death.

Other games
 Black Mask appears as a boss in Batman: Dark Tomorrow, voiced by Tom McKeon.
 Black Mask appears in DC Universe Online.
 Black Mask appears in Scribblenauts Unmasked: A DC Comics Adventure.

Merchandise
 DC Collectibles released a 7-inch Black Mask action figure in a Batman: Arkham Origins four-pack along with Batman, the Joker, and Deathstroke. This figure was sculpted by Gentle Giant Studios and includes two automatic pistols.
 TriForce released a Batman: Arkham Origins Black Mask Arsenal Full Scale Replica, consisting of the character's mask and knuckleduster, crafted and cast in polystone. The replica measures 18 inches in height, weighs in at 15 pounds, and is limited to 500 pieces worldwide.
 A Funko Pop! vinyl figure of Roman Sionis based on his appearance in Bird of Prey was released in 2020.

Miscellaneous
Professional wrestler Andrade El Idolo wears attire based on Black Mask as his entrance gear for All Elite Wrestling, which he debuted in AEW Road Rager.

See also
 List of Batman family enemies

References

External links
 Black Mask at DC Comics' official website

DC Comics supervillains
Characters created by Doug Moench
Comics characters introduced in 1985
DC Comics film characters
DC Comics male supervillains
DC Comics television characters
Fictional business executives
Fictional crime bosses
Fictional cult leaders
Fictional escapologists
Fictional gangsters
Action film villains
Male film villains
Fictional characters with disfigurements
Fictional kidnappers
Fictional marksmen and snipers
Fictional mass murderers
Fictional matricides
Fictional patricides
Fictional serial killers
Fictional torturers
Suicide Squad members
Video game bosses
Batman characters